The 2022 China League One was the 19th season of the China League One, the second tier of the Chinese football league pyramid, since its establishment in 2004.

Format
On 12 May 2022, the Chinese Football Association announced the format of the season. The season will be divided into 4 stages (8, 8, 8 and 10 rounds respectively). In the first stage, 18 teams will be divided into three groups. The hosts will be allocated to each group and other teams will be drawn based on last season's rankings. In the second, third and fourth stage, the teams in three groups will be switched to ensure that each team can play against each other twice.

Groups
The draw for the stages took place on 12 May 2022.

Centralised venues
Tangshan (Groups A, D, G and L)
Tangshan Nanhu City Football Training Base Field No.1
Tangshan Nanhu City Football Training Base Field No.2
Tangshan Nanhu City Football Training Base Field No.3
Nanjing (Groups B, E, H and J)
Jiangning Football Training Base Field No.2
Jiangning Football Training Base Stadium
Dalian (Groups C, F, I and K)
Dalian Sports Centre Stadium Field No.3
Dalian Youth Football Training Base Main Stadium

Clubs

Club changes

To League One
Teams relegated from 2021 Chinese Super League
 Qingdao

Teams promoted from 2021 China League Two
 Qingdao Hainiu
 Hebei Kungfu
 Guangxi Pingguo Haliao
 Qingdao Youth Island
 Shanghai Jiading Huilong

From League One
Teams promoted to 2022 Chinese Super League
 Wuhan Three Towns
 Meizhou Hakka
 Zhejiang
 Chengdu Rongcheng

Dissolved entries
 Guizhou

Name changes
 Hebei Kungfu F.C. changed their name to Shijiazhuang Gongfu in March 2022.

Clubs information

Managerial changes

Foreign players
Players name in bold indicates the player is registered during the mid-season transfer window.

 For Hong Kong, Macau, or Taiwanese players, if they are non-naturalized and were registered as professional footballers in Hong Kong's, Macau's, or Chinese Taipei's football association for the first time, they are recognized as native players. Otherwise they are recognized as foreign players.

League table

Results

Chinese Football Association awarded Jiangxi Beidamen and Kunshan each a 3–0 win against Beijing BIT after Beijing BIT failed to arrive in the centralised venues due to COVID-19 travel restrictions. These matches were not played.
Chinese Football Association awarded Heilongjiang Ice City a 3–0 win against Zibo Cuju after Zibo Cuju failed to name enough players to compete. The match was not played.

Positions by round

Chinese Football Association awarded Jiangxi Beidamen and Kunshan each a 3–0 win against Beijing BIT after Beijing BIT failed to arrive in the centralised venues due to COVID-19 travel restrictions. These matches were not played. The decision was made between rounds 7 and 8.
Chinese Football Association awarded Heilongjiang Ice City a 3–0 win against Zibo Cuju after Zibo Cuju failed to name enough players to compete. The match was not played and it was originally scheduled to be played in round 12.

Results by match played

Chinese Football Association awarded Jiangxi Beidamen and Kunshan each a 3–0 win against Beijing BIT after Beijing BIT failed to arrive in the centralised venues due to COVID-19 travel restrictions. These matches were not played.
Chinese Football Association awarded Heilongjiang Ice City a 3–0 win against Zibo Cuju after Zibo Cuju failed to name enough players to compete. The match was not played.

Goalscorers

Top scorers

Hat-tricks

League attendance

Notes

References

External links

China League One seasons
2
China